"Bigger than Us" is a song by English Indie rock band White Lies from their second studio album, Ritual. It was released as the lead single on 3 January 2011 in the United Kingdom, where it debuted at number 42. A live version of the track was made available by the band for download.

The single received its first airplay on Zane Lowe's BBC Radio 1 show on 16 November 2010. On 18 November 2010 the video premiered on the NMEs website.

The song is featured on the soundtrack of the 2010 video game Need for Speed: Hot Pursuit, its 2020 remaster of the same name, and F1 2011.

Music video
The music video for "Bigger than Us" was shot by French directorial duo Jonas & François. On 18 November 2010 the video premièred on the NMEs website.
The video is a homage to Steven Spielberg's 1982 film E.T. the Extra-Terrestrial. The video recreates elements of E.T.'s apparent death whilst he is quarantined alongside Elliott. The character of E.T. is played by a large "Bigger than Us" candy bar which contains a young girl. Elliot is watched over by Gertie and Mary whilst what may be Greg and Steve wait outside. There are other intertextual references to the film featured in the video, the basketballs circling the band at 2:56, the bright red light within the bass drum at 3:08 and the images of the woods where the original film sees E.T. return home.

Track listing
Digital download
"Bigger than Us" – 4:43

7" vinyl
"Bigger than Us"
"Bigger than Us (Datassette Remix)"

Charts

Release history

References

White Lies (band) songs
2010 singles
Song recordings produced by Alan Moulder
2010 songs
Fiction Records singles